In algebraic topology, the mapping spectrum  of spectra X, Y is characterized by

References 

Algebraic topology